Cheb is a city in the Czech Republic.

Cheb may also refer to:

 Cheb, Iran, a village in Iran
 Cheb (film), a 1991 film
 Cheb Balowski, a Spanish musical group of ten singers in Spanish, Catalan, and Arabic
 Cheb i Sabbah (1947–2013), DJ
 a title for raï musicians (from Arabic  young):
 Cheb Bilal (born 1966), well-known Algerian raï singer
 Cheb Hasni (1968–1994), performer of Algerian raï music
 Cheb Khaled, another raï music performer
 Cheb Mami (born 1966), stage name of another Algerian raï music performer
 Cheb Sahraoui (born 1961), Algerian raï musician
Cheb (musician), Moroccan musician

Biology
 CheB, is a demethylase of methyl-accepting chemotaxis proteins (MCP)